Vividha Tirtha Kalpa is a widely cited Jain text composed by Jinaprabha Suri in the 14th century CE. It is a compilation of about 60 Kalpas (sections), most of them give the accounts of major Jain Tirthas.

Vividha Tirtha Kalpa is an example of the tirtha-mala texts that are compilations about Jain Tirthas throughout India, ranging from Nirvana Kanda of Kundakunda to modern publications.

Jinaprabh Suri is said to have written three Jain prayers in Persian.

Author
Jinaprabha Suri lived during the rule of Muhammad bin Tughluq. He travelled widely and has left a record of contemporary events as well as oral traditions. He was born in Mohilvadi, Gujarat in the Tambi clan of Shrimal Jain community. He was initiated at the age of 8 and became an Acharya in Kharatara Gaccha at 23.

Composition time
Some of the Kalpas contain the date of compositions, although most are undated. The dates range from Samvat 1364 (Vaibhargiri Kalpa) to Samvat 1389. The last section of the book was written in 1332 CE in Delhi during the rule of Muhammad Bin Tuglaq.

Contents

The tirthas mentioned cover regions (as divided by Muni Jinvijay):
 Gujarat and Kathiawad
 Punjab and Uttar Pradesh
 Maharashtra
 Rajasthan and Malava
 Eastern Uttar Pradesh and Bihar
 Karnataka and Telangana

The description suggests that at that time, while the Svetambara-Digambara division had become distinct, the tirtha were visited by Jains of both sects. He describes the building and destruction of many temples in recent period.

See also
 Tirth Pat
 Jainism in Delhi
 Shatrunjaya

Notes

Further reading

Jain texts